The Patriotic Front in Zimbabwe was a coalition of two African Leadership parties: the Zimbabwe African Peoples Union (ZAPU) and the Zimbabwe African National Union (ZANU) which had worked together to fight against white minority rule in Rhodesia.

In 1980 elections ZAPU contested as Patriotic Front whereas ZANU contested as ZANU-Patriotic Front.

In 1988 the ruling ZANU absorbed ZAPU to become [Zimbabwe African National Union – Patriotic Front] (ZANU-PF) for good.

Defunct political parties in Zimbabwe
Defunct political party alliances in Africa
Political parties with year of disestablishment missing
Political parties with year of establishment missing
Political party alliances in Zimbabwe
Socialist parties in Zimbabwe
ZANU–PF
Zimbabwe African People's Union